Růžena Beinhauerová (23 September 1912 – 16 May 1968) was a Czech alpine skier. She competed in the women's combined event at the 1936 Winter Olympics. In addition to skiing, she also played basketball and after the Second World War she was the Czechoslovak representative in rowing.

References

1912 births
1968 deaths
Czech female alpine skiers
Olympic alpine skiers of Czechoslovakia
Alpine skiers at the 1936 Winter Olympics
Sportspeople from Ostrava